Bekhterev is a Russian masculine surname, its feminine counterpart is Bekhtereva. It may refer to:

 Dmitri Bekhterev (born 1949), Russian rower
Natalia Bekhtereva (1924–2008), Russian neuroscientist and psychologist
6074 Bechtereva, a minor planet
 Vladimir Bekhterev (1857–1927), Russian neurologist, grandfather of Natalia
Bekhterev–Jacobsohn reflex
Bekhterev–Mendel reflex
Bekhterev Psychoneurological Institute
Bekhterev Review of Psychiatry and Medical Psychology
Bekhterev's mixture
Bekhterev’s Disease

Russian-language surnames